Arthur Mills (20 December 1923 – 28 December 2001) was a New Zealand cricketer. He played one first-class match for Otago in 1947/48.

See also
 List of Otago representative cricketers

References

External links
 

1923 births
2001 deaths
New Zealand cricketers
Otago cricketers
Cricketers from Invercargill